This article concerns the demography of Réunion. People of Réunion are Réunionese. The official language is French, and Réunionese Creole is widely spoken.

Population
The birth rate was estimated at 21.84 births per 1,000 population, and the death rate at 5.55 deaths per 1,000 population in the same year. The net migration rate was zero in 2000. The following table describes age structure and sex ratios in Réunion.

Structure of the population 

Structure of the population (01.01.2010) (Provisional estimates): 

Population by Sex and Age Group (Census 01.I.2015): 

Population Estimates by Sex and Age Group (01.VII.2020):

Historical population

Vital statistics

Life expectancy
At birth, life expectancy is 76.5 years for male children, and 82.9 for female (figures for 2011).

Religion 

The predominant religion is the Catholic branch of Christianity, with Hinduism, Islam and Buddhism also represented, among others.

Language 
French is the only official language of Reunion. Although not official, Réunion Creole is also commonly spoken by the majority of the population. One can hear it in any administration or office, but education is only in French.

Tamil is taught as optional language in some schools. Due to the diverse population, other languages such as Mandarin, Hakka and Cantonese are also spoken by members of the Chinese community, but fewer people speak these languages as younger generations start to converse in French. The number of speakers of Indian languages (mostly Urdu and Gujarati) is also dropping sharply. Arabic is taught in mosques and spoken by a small community of Arabs.

Ethnic groups

Ethnic groups present include people of European, African, Malagasy, Indians and Chinese origin as well as many of mixed race. Local names for these are used: Yabs, Cafres, Malbars and Zarabes (both ethnic groups of Indian origin) and Chinois.

The proportion of people of each ethnicity is not known exactly, since the 1958 constitution bans questions about ethnicity in compulsory censuses in France. Extensive and long-going intermarriage also blurs the issue. People of primarily African descent make up 35% of the population, those of primarily European and Indian descent number about one-quarter each, and people of Chinese, Malay, Vietnamese descent, along with those identifying as Métis, form roughly 15%.

People of Tamil origin make up the majority of the Indo-Réunionnais people; Gujarati, Bihari and other origins form the remainder of the population. The island's community of Muslims from modern region of Pakistan and North India and elsewhere is also commonly referred to as Zarabes.

Creoles (a name given to those born on the island, of various ethnic origins), make up the majority of the population. Groups that are not creole include people from Metropolitan France (known as Zoreilles) and those from Mayotte and the Comoros.

Genetics 
In 2005, a genetic study on the racially mixed people of Réunion found the following.
For maternal (mitochondrial) DNA, the haplogroups are Indian (44%), East Asian (27%), European/Middle Eastern (19%) or African (10%). The Indian lineages are M2, M6 and U2i, the East Asian ones are E1, D5a, M7c, and F (E1 and M7c also found only in South East Asia and in Madagascar), the European/Middle Eastern ones are U2e, T1, J, H, and I, and the African ones are L1b1, L2a1, L3b, and L3e1.

For paternal (Y-chromosome) DNA, the haplogroups are European/Middle Eastern (85%) or East Asian (15%). The European lineages are R1b and I, the Middle Eastern one E1b1b1c (formerly E3b3) (also found in Northeast Africa), and the East Asian ones are R1a (found in many parts of the world including Europe and Central and Southern Asia but the particular sequence has been found in Asia) and O3.

References

External links
Réunion page at INSEE

 
Demographics of France
Réunion